America's Credit Union Museum is located in Manchester, New Hampshire, on the site of the first credit union founded in the United States. The museum is housed at the original location for St. Mary's Cooperative Credit Association, renamed in 1925 to La Caisse Populaire Ste.-Marie, or "Bank of the People", St. Mary's. In 1996, the building was listed on the National Register of Historic Places as the Building at 418–420 Notre Dame Ave.

What is now the museum was formerly a three-story, three-family dwelling belonging to Joseph Boivin, the manager of the St. Mary's Cooperative Credit Association. Boivin started the credit union with the help of Monsignor Pierre Hevey and Alphonse Desjardins. The building was donated to the museum by Mr. & Mrs. Armand Lemire. To create the museum, the first two floors were converted into exhibit space about credit union history in the United States. The first floor pays tribute to the founding era of the credit union from 1908 to 1933. The second floor has historical artifacts beginning from 1934, featuring the Estes Park conference that created the Credit Union National Association, and the 1934 Federal Credit Union Act which enabled credit unions to be established in all states in the nation. The third floor contains an 85-person capacity meeting space with LCD projectors.

See also 
 National Register of Historic Places listings in Hillsborough County, New Hampshire
 Sainte Marie Roman Catholic Church Parish Historic District, and Ste. Marie Church (Manchester, New Hampshire), also located on Notre Dame Avenue in Manchester
 New Hampshire Historical Marker No. 208: St. Mary's Bank Credit Union / La Caisse Populaire Sainte-Marie
 History of credit unions
 Monsignor Pierre Hevey
 Edward Filene

References

External links 
 

Credit unions of the United States
Credit unions based in New Hampshire
Museums in Manchester, New Hampshire
Numismatic museums in the United States
History museums in New Hampshire
Commercial buildings on the National Register of Historic Places in New Hampshire
National Register of Historic Places in Manchester, New Hampshire